The large moth family Gelechiidae contains the following genera:

Acanthophila
Acompsia
Acrophiletis
Acutitornus
Adelomorpha
Adoxotricha
Adullamitis
Aeolotrocha
Aerotypia
Agathactis
Agnippe
Agonochaetia
Allophlebia
Allotelphusa
Alsodryas
Altenia
Ambloma
Amblypalpis
Amblyphylla
Amphigenes
Amphitrias
Anacampsis
Anapatetris
Anaptilora
Anarsia
Anasphaltis
Anastomopteryx
Anastreblotis
Angustialata
Angustiphylla
Anisoplaca
Anomologa
Anomoxena
Anthinora
Anthistarcha
Antithyra
Apatetris
Aphanostola
Apocritica
Apodia
Aponoea
Apotactis
Apothetoeca
Apotistatus
Aproaerema
Araeophalla
Araeophylla
Araeovalva
Ardozyga
Aregha
Argolamprotes
Argophara
Argyrolacia
Aristotelia
Arla
Aroga
Arogalea
Arotria
Arotromima
Asapharcha
Aspades
Atasthalistis
Athrips
Atremaea
Aulidiotis
Australiopalpa
Autodectis
Axyrostola

References

 Natural History Museum Lepidoptera genus database

Gelechiidae
Gelechiid